In geometry, a bitruncation is an operation on regular polytopes. It represents a truncation beyond rectification. The original edges are lost completely and the original faces remain as smaller copies of themselves.

Bitruncated regular polytopes can be represented by an extended Schläfli symbol notation  or

In regular polyhedra and tilings 
For regular polyhedra (i.e. regular 3-polytopes), a bitruncated form is the truncated dual. For example, a bitruncated cube is a truncated octahedron.

In regular 4-polytopes and honeycombs 

For a regular 4-polytope, a bitruncated form is a dual-symmetric operator. A bitruncated 4-polytope is the same as the bitruncated dual, and will have double the symmetry if the original 4-polytope is self-dual.

A regular polytope (or honeycomb) {p, q, r} will have its {p, q} cells bitruncated into truncated {q, p} cells, and the vertices are replaced by truncated {q, r} cells.

Self-dual {p,q,p} 4-polytope/honeycombs 
An interesting result of this operation is that self-dual 4-polytope {p,q,p} (and honeycombs) remain cell-transitive after bitruncation. There are 5 such forms corresponding to the five truncated regular polyhedra: t{q,p}. Two are honeycombs on the 3-sphere, one a honeycomb in Euclidean 3-space, and two are honeycombs in hyperbolic 3-space.

See also 
 uniform polyhedron
 uniform 4-polytope
 Rectification (geometry)
 Truncation (geometry)

References 
 Coxeter, H.S.M. Regular Polytopes, (3rd edition, 1973), Dover edition,  (pp. 145–154 Chapter 8: Truncation)
 Norman Johnson Uniform Polytopes, Manuscript (1991)
 N.W. Johnson: The Theory of Uniform Polytopes and Honeycombs, Ph.D. Dissertation, University of Toronto, 1966
 John H. Conway, Heidi Burgiel, Chaim Goodman-Strauss, The Symmetries of Things 2008,  (Chapter 26)

External links 
 

Polytopes